Art Ninja is a British children's television art-sitcom hybrid hosted by Ricky Martin. The show is produced by Dot to Dot Productions for CBBC and began on 17 January 2015. The series follows presenter Ricky and his life where he makes arts with his friends Rich Thorne, Michelle Ackerley, Gavin "Gav" Strange and Sarah Matthews. Ella Lia Trudgeon and Ricky's dad, Terry Martin also appears in some episodes. Three series of 10 episodes each have been aired. Short compilation episodes are as Nine Minute Ninja.

A fifth series was commissioned by CBBC in Spring 2018, which aired in 2019.

Format
Each episode follows a sitcom format with instructional art segments, like Art Attack or SMart. Each episode's makes has a theme to them, such as animals or aliens. An episode will usually consist of several small makes the viewer is able to make at home, an animation, a small drawing on a post-it note, a make made with a viewer on Skype, a small make with the character The Grandmaster and a big make (in the way of Art Attack), usually using a large amount of a certain material, like coins or clingfilm.

Production
Art Ninja came around after Ricky Martin's pilot, Ricky's Radical Reinventions was not picked up by CBBC. Dot to Dot Productions were looking for a recommission of their former art series, Totally Rubbish. However, CBBC's commissioner Cheryl Taylor wanted to create a new art brand. According to Martin, the series was aiming to be "The Naked Chef, meets art, meets Jackass." The working title for the series was Art Monkey.

Episodes

Series 1 (2015)

Series 2 (2016)

Series 3 (2017)

Series 4 (2018)

Series 5 (2018 - 2019)

References

External links 
 
 Production Website

2015 British television series debuts
2010s British sitcoms
CBBC shows
BBC children's television shows
Television series about art
2010s British children's television series
English-language television shows
BBC television sitcoms